Eucladium is a genus of mosses belonging to the family Pottiaceae.

The genus has almost cosmopolitan distribution.

Species:
 Eucladium commutatum Gl.
 Eucladium curvirostre

References

Pottiaceae
Moss genera